Berkad Ali Hersi is a town in the Aynabo District, in the Sool region of Somaliland.

See also
Administrative divisions of Somaliland
Regions of Somaliland
Districts of Somaliland
Somalia–Somaliland border

References

Populated places in Sool, Somaliland